Bigo may refer to:

 Bigo bya Mugenyi, archaeological site in Uganda
 Bigo Bay, Antarctica
 Bigo Live, a streaming platform
 Mount Bigo, Antarctica
 Didier Bigo (born 1956), French scholar of security studies
 Bigoriki, a character in American children's animated television series GoGoRiki

See also
Richard Barnett (protester), known as "Bigo"
 Big O (disambiguation)